Little Women is a 2018 American drama film directed by Clare Niederpruem, from a screenplay by Niederpruem and Kristi Shimek. The sixth film adaptation of Louisa May Alcott's 1868–69 two-volume novel of the same name, it is a modern retelling of the original story and marks the 150th anniversary of the release of the book's first volume. The film stars Sarah Davenport, Allie Jennings, Lucas Grabeel, Ian Bohen, and Lea Thompson. It was released in the United States on September 28, 2018, by Pinnacle Peak.

Plot 
Set in the early 2000s, four siblings grow up together. Jo  is an aspiring writer who travels to New York and eventually marries her professor, Freddy Bhaer. Beth plays the piano, has a battle against cancer throughout the movie, and eventually dies of leukemia. Amy becomes an internationally-renowned painter and marries Laurie Laurence. Meg, who struggles with wanting to be happily married versus being able to help with her family's finances, marries Laurie's former tutor and has twins.

Cast
 Sarah Davenport as Jo March
Aimee Lynne Johnson as Young Jo
 Allie Jennings as Beth March
Reese Oliveira as Young Beth
 Melanie Stone as Meg March
 Taylor Murphy as Amy March
Elise Jones as Young Amy
 Lucas Grabeel as Theodore "Laurie" Laurence 
 Stuart Edge as John Brooke
 Ian Bohen as Frederick "Freddy" Bhaer
 Lea Thompson as Marmee March
 Bart Johnson as Papa March
 Adam Johnson as Duke Senior
 Michael Flynn as Mr. Laurence
 Barta Heiner as Aunt March

Production
In April 2017, it was announced Lea Thompson and Lucas Grabeel had joined the cast of the directorial debut of Clare Niederpruem, directing from a screenplay she wrote alongside Kristi Shimek, based upon the novel of the same name by Louisa May Alcott.  Maclain Nelson and Stephen Shimek will serve as producers on the film, while Chris Donahue and Marybeth Sprows, will executive produce the film under their Main Dog Productions and Paulist Productions banners, respectively. In June 2017, Sarah Davenport and Ian Bohen joined the cast of the film.

Principal photography began in June 2017, in Salt Lake City, Utah.

Music

Track listing 
Track listing adapted from IMDb

Release 
In June 2018, it was announced Pinnacle Peak and Pure Flix Entertainment would distribute the film. It was released in the United States on September 28, 2018.

Box office
In the United States and Canada, Little Women was released alongside Smallfoot, Night School and Hell Fest, and was projected to gross $3–5 million from 643 theaters in its opening weekend. It ended up grossing just $747,000, finishing 16th at the box office.

Critical response
The site's critics consensus reads, "This updated version of Little Women may hold some appeal for newcomers, but fans of the classic source material have far better adaptations to choose from." At Metacritic, the film has a weighted average score of 40 out of 100 based on 11 critic reviews, indicating "mixed or average reviews". Nell Minow of RogerEbert.com gave it 3 out of 4 stars and wrote, "For devotees, the essence of the Little Women story remains, and, for newcomers, it is a sweet film that should inspire them to explore the book and the more traditional adaptations." But Elizabeth Weitzman of The Wrap gave it low marks, writing, "The girls in this contemporary retelling ... are not messy and complex human beings but Hallmark Channel characters, two-dimensional symbols of virtuous nostalgia." Faith-based reviewers were more generous. Kristin Smith of Plugged In said the film "illustrates the importance of loving one another, of practicing forgiveness and of moving forward despite difficult times." Michael Foust of Crosswalk wrote that "unlike other modern-day film adaptations that spoiled a classic, Little Women is an updated version that doesn’t ruin what made the original great. ... Here’s hoping [Niederpruem] makes many more like this one."

References

External links
 
 

2018 films
American drama films
Films about sisters
Films shot in Salt Lake City
Little Women films
2018 directorial debut films
2018 drama films
Little Women character redirects to lists
2010s English-language films
2010s American films